William Pichard (12 October 1897 – 23 December 1957) was a Swiss bobsledder. He competed in the four-man event at the 1928 Winter Olympics.

References

External links
 

1897 births
1957 deaths
Swiss male bobsledders
Olympic bobsledders of Switzerland
Bobsledders at the 1928 Winter Olympics
Sportspeople from the canton of Vaud